Hamilton North is a suburb in central Hamilton in New Zealand. It was not depicted a suburb until there was a need to distinguish between the different parts of the Hamilton CBD. The suburbs of Hamilton Central and Hamilton North were divided in 1963.

Demographics

Kirikiriroa had a population of 267 at the 2018 New Zealand census, an increase of 117 people (78.0%) since the 2013 census, and an increase of 138 people (107.0%) since the 2006 census. There were 90 households, comprising 150 males and 117 females, giving a sex ratio of 1.28 males per female. The median age was 31.2 years (compared with 37.4 years nationally), with 24 people (9.0%) aged under 15 years, 102 (38.2%) aged 15 to 29, 132 (49.4%) aged 30 to 64, and 9 (3.4%) aged 65 or older.

Ethnicities were 41.6% European/Pākehā, 27.0% Māori, 5.6% Pacific peoples, 36.0% Asian, and 3.4% other ethnicities. People may identify with more than one ethnicity.

The percentage of people born overseas was 40.4, compared with 27.1% nationally.

Although some people chose not to answer the census's question about religious affiliation, 41.6% had no religion, 29.2% were Christian, 3.4% had Māori religious beliefs, 9.0% were Hindu, 4.5% were Muslim, 1.1% were Buddhist and 5.6% had other religions.

Of those at least 15 years old, 63 (25.9%) people had a bachelor's or higher degree, and 36 (14.8%) people had no formal qualifications. The median income was $21,100, compared with $31,800 nationally. 30 people (12.3%) earned over $70,000 compared to 17.2% nationally. The employment status of those at least 15 was that 120 (49.4%) people were employed full-time, 33 (13.6%) were part-time, and 18 (7.4%) were unemployed.

Features of Hamilton North

Waikato Stadium

Waikato Stadium, formerly Rugby Park, is a major sporting and cultural events venue in Hamilton with a total capacity of 25,800. The stadium is a multi-purpose facility, though used mainly for rugby union.

Founders Theatre
Founders Theatre was Hamilton's largest and best-known theatrical venue with a capacity of 1,249, opened in 1961. It was officially opened on 17 November 1962 by Mayor Denis Rogers, and the Dame Hilda Ross Memorial Fountain, in front of the theatre, was opened by Prime Minister Keith Holyoake in 1963. The theatre also performed an important Town Hall function for the city hosting many Civic and Institutional ceremonies. In 2015 the flying system, holding stage curtains, lights, scenery, etc was found to be unsafe. The theatre doors closed on 1 March 2016, due to health and safety concerns. The city council took submissions from residents of Hamilton to decide its future and was, in 2018, exploring proposals. Further investigation classified the theatre as earthquake-prone, so it will be demolished.

The adjacent fountain in Boyes Park was built in 1978 for $87,000 and contains a time capsule of Hamilton's Centenary.

Casabella Lane

Located between Barton St and Angelsea St, Casabella Lane is a Spanish themed lane with 21 boutique shops and 9 apartments, built about 2000.

The Farming Family
The Farming Family was donated to the city by controversial businessman, Sir Robert Jones, in 1990 to commemorate the ordinary farming family as being the unsung heroes of Hamilton's 150-year history. The statue, a bronze life-sized sculpture created by Margriet Windhausen van den Berg, has sparked much debate about whether it solely celebrates the European history of the Waikato region. The Farming Family consists of a male farmer and his wife, two young children, a dairy cow, a sheep and a dog. The statue is located on a traffic island at the intersection of Victoria Street and Ulster Street. It has been described as "racist and offensive".

See also
Suburbs of Hamilton, New Zealand

References

Suburbs of Hamilton, New Zealand